Leonty Yakovlevich Ugyumov (1887 – August 14, 1937) was a Soviet komkor (corps commander). He was born in what is now Usolye, Usolsky District, Perm Krai. He fought for the Imperial Russian Army during World War I before going over to the Bolsheviks during the subsequent civil war. He led several Red Army units, including the 57th Rifle Division and temporarily the 4th Army.  

During the Great Purge, he was arrested on May 21, 1937 and later executed. After the death of Joseph Stalin, he was rehabilitated on May 23, 1956.

References
 

1887 births
1937 deaths
Russian military personnel of World War I
Soviet military personnel of the Russian Civil War
Ugryumov
Great Purge victims from Russia
People executed by the Soviet Union
Soviet rehabilitations